Ronald Lewis Steel (born March 25, 1931) is an American writer, historian, and professor. He is the author of the definitive biography of Walter Lippmann.

Biography

Ronald Steel was born in 1931 in Morris, Illinois outside of Chicago. He earned his Bachelor of Arts degree in Political Science and English from Northwestern University (1953) and a Master of Arts degree in political economy from Harvard University (1955).

He served in the United States Army and was a diplomat in the United States Foreign Service.

He is the author of Walter Lippmann and the American Century, the definitive biography of Lippman. For this book, he was awarded the 1980 National Book Critics Circle Award in General Nonfiction, a National Book Award,
the Bancroft Prize, and the Los Angeles Times Book Prize for History. The book was also nominated for the Pulitzer Prize in Biography.

He was awarded a Guggenheim Fellowship in 1973.

Steel is a Professor Emeritus of International Relations, History, and Journalism at the University of Southern California.  Before teaching at USC, he taught at Yale University, Rutgers University, Wellesley College, Dartmouth College, George Washington University, UCLA, and Princeton University.

Later, Steel wrote for The New Republic in the 1980s. He has also written for the Atlantic Monthly, The New York Times and The New York Review of Books.

Works
 U.S. Foreign Trade Policy, 1962 
 Italy, 1963
 The End of Alliance: America and the Future of Europe, 1964
 North Africa, 1967
 Pax Americana, 1967
 Imperialists and other Heroes: A chronicle of the American Empire, 1971
 Walter Lippmann and the American century, 1980
 Temptations of a Superpower, 1995 
 In Love with Night: the American romance with Robert Kennedy, 2000

Notes

References

External links

1931 births
Living people
21st-century American historians
21st-century American male writers
Bancroft Prize winners
National Book Award winners
The New Republic people
Northwestern University alumni
Harvard University alumni
University of Southern California faculty
People from Morris, Illinois
Historians from Illinois
Historians from California
American male non-fiction writers